"God Who Listens" is a song by American contemporary Christian musician Chris Tomlin featuring American country music singer-songwriter Thomas Rhett. The song was released as the second single from his thirteenth studio album, Chris Tomlin & Friends (2020), on February 5, 2021. Tomlin co-wrote the song with Ashley Gorley, David Garcia, and Thomas Rhett. The single was produced by David Garcia.

Background
"God Who Listens" was released by Chris Tomlin on February 5, 2021, as the second single from Chris Tomlin & Friends (2020), following the lead single "Who You Are to Me." Chris Tomlin shared the message behind the song, saying: "This song is centered around what sets God apart from all the other idols and gods in the world—He listens. Not sometimes, but always. You know, sometimes He is listening and moving in our lives, and we have no idea, and sometimes He is listening and moving, and it is so apparent."

Composition

Commercial performance
"God Who Listens" debuted at No. 43 on the US Hot Christian Songs chart dated August 15, 2020, concurrently charting at No. 13 on the Christian Digital Song Sales chart. The song peaked at No. 13 on Hot Christian Songs chart and spent a total of twenty six non-consecutive weeks appearing on the chart.

Music video
The lyric video of "God Who Listens" was published via Chris Tomlin's YouTube channel on June 26, 2020.

Personnel
Adapted from AllMusic.
 Adam Ayan — mastering
 David Garcia — mixing, producer
 Thomas Rhett — featured artist, vocals
 Chris Tomlin — primary artist

Charts

Weekly charts

Year-end charts

Release history

References

External links
  on PraiseCharts

 

2020 songs
2021 singles
Chris Tomlin songs
Thomas Rhett songs
Songs written by Ashley Gorley
Songs written by Chris Tomlin
Songs written by David Garcia (musician)
Songs written by Thomas Rhett
Male vocal duets